The following table indicates the party of elected officials in the U.S. state of Ohio:
Governor
Lieutenant Governor
Attorney General
Secretary of State
State Treasurer
State Auditor

The table also indicates the historical party composition in the:
State Senate
State House of Representatives
State Supreme Court
State delegation to the U.S. Senate
State delegation to the U.S. House of Representatives

For years in which a presidential election was held, the table indicates which party's nominees received the state's electoral votes. Also indicated is the party that controlled the Ohio Apportionment Board, which draws legislative districts for the Ohio General Assembly in the years following the United States Census.

1788–1845

1846–present

See also
Elections in Ohio
Political demographics and history in Ohio
Politics of Ohio

References

Politics of Ohio
Government of Ohio
Ohio